Banda language may refer to:

One of the Banda languages of central Africa
Banda language (Maluku), an Austronesian language of Indonesia